Chrysotoxum vernale is a species of hoverfly.

References

Insects described in 1841
Diptera of Europe
Syrphinae
Taxa named by Hermann Loew